The Pottawatomi River is a river in the municipalities of Owen Sound and Georgian Bluffs, Grey County in Southwestern Ontario, Canada. It is in the Great Lakes Basin and empties into Owen Sound, an inlet of Georgian Bay on Lake Huron, at Owen Sound Harbour.

Course
The river begins in a field in geographic Derby Township in Georgian Bluffs. It flows southeast, then turns northeast for the remainder of its course. It takes passes under Ontario Highway 21 at the community of Springmount, and passes over the Niagara Escarpment at Jones Falls. The river then takes in the right tributary Maxwell Creek, enters the municipality of Owen Sound, and reaches its mouth at Georgian Bay.

Tributaries
Maxwell Creek

See also
List of rivers of Ontario

References

External links
Grey Sauble Conservation Authority

Rivers of Grey County
Tributaries of Georgian Bay